The 1963 National Challenge Cup was the 50th edition of the USSFA's annual open soccer championship. The Philadelphia Ukrainians defeated the Los Angeles Armenian to win.

Final

References
 

Lamar Hunt U.S. Open Cup
U.S. Open Cup